Kurumbalangode is a small village located near Nilambur in Malappuram district of Kerala, India. It is situated in chungathara grama panchayath. It is situated river side of Chaliyar River and western ghats. 70% of the local people are directly or indirectly working with rubber products and rest of them are working abroad, Govt job and doing other professions. The main source of income of the people is from rubber or latex related industries. There is a Higher Secondary School called Nirmala Higher Secondary School and several primary schools such as, Government UP School Kurumbalangode, Nirmala English Medium School, AMLP School Mundapadam etc. The school has contributed immensely for the educational development of Kurumbalangode, Erumamunda and near by villages. Kurumbalangode is one of the highly developed village in chungathara panchayath and Nilambur municipality. 

Kurumbalangode Village office situated here. A Primary Health Centre and a homeo dispensary is working here. There is Telephone Exchange. It is very close to Adyan Para waterfalls a famous picnic spot in this area.

Demographics
 India census, Kurumbalangode had a population of 20017 with 9835 males and 10182 females.

References

Villages in Malappuram district